The 1981 Division 1 season was the 18th of the competition of the first-tier football in Senegal.  The tournament was organized by the Senegalese Football Federation.  US Gorée won the second title and participated in the 1982 African Cup of Champions Clubs the following year.  AS Police participated in the 1982 CAF Cup Winner's Cup and SEIB Diourbel in the 1982 West African Cup.

SEIB Diourbel (now SONACOS) was the defending team of the title.  A total of 14 clubs participated in the competition.  The season featured 337 matches, the match with Casa Sport and ASC Niayès was cancelled and scored 378 goals.  No new clubs came from the second division (Division 2).

Participating clubs

 US Gorée
 SEIB Diourbel
 ASC Niayes-Pikine
 AS Police
 US Rail
 ASC Jeanne d'Arc
 Casa Sports

 ASEC Ndiambour
 ASC Diaraf
 Stade de Mbour
 ASFA Dakar
 ASC Linguère
 Mbosse FC
 ASC Talba

Overview
The league was contested by 14 teams with US Gorée winning the championship.

League standings

Footnotes

External links
http://www.rsssf.com/tablesk/sene81.html

Senegal
Senegal Premier League seasons